Maliha Hussain (born 1974) is a Pakistani former cricketer who played as an all-rounder. She appeared in eight One Day Internationals for Pakistan in 1997, including playing at the 1997 World Cup.

References

External links
 
 

1974 births
Living people
Cricketers from Karachi
Pakistani women cricketers
Pakistan women One Day International cricketers
Date of birth missing (living people)